David Crutchfield (2 August 1965 – 29 November 2002) was an Australian rules footballer who played with Fitzroy in the Victorian Football League (VFL)

Career
Recruited from South Warrnambool, Crutchfield played in the final four rounds of the 1985 VFL season. His most productive game was against Geelong, when he had 17 disposals. He didn't make any further appearances and ended up in Queensland playing for Southport. In 1992 he was involved in a three-way tie for the Grogan Medal.

Crutchfield was later a successful player coach in South Australia's Riverland Football League. He steered Loxton North to four premierships in a row, from 1997 to 2000.

Personal life
Crutchfield suffered from depression and committed suicide in 2002 at the age of 37.

His elder brother, Michael Crutchfield, is the member for South Barwon in the Victorian Legislative Assembly.

References

External links
 
 

1965 births
Australian rules footballers from Victoria (Australia)
Fitzroy Football Club players
Southport Australian Football Club players
South Warrnambool Football Club players
2002 suicides
Suicides in Australia